The Cheshire Women's & Youth Football League is an amateur competitive women's association football competition based in Cheshire, England run by the Cheshire FA. Founded in the 2011–12 season, the league is a recipient of the FA Charter Standard Award.

The league consists of open age divisions and a youth division. It is at level 7 to 8 of the women's pyramid. It promotes to the North West Women's Regional Football League Division One, and does not relegate to any league.

2022 - 2023 teams

Premier Division 
 Altrincham Development Reds
 Chester City Development WFC
 Ellesmere Port Ladies 1st
 Sandbach United Ladies
 Brookvale United
 Nantwich Town Ladies 
 Runcorn Sports Women
 Macclesfield FC Women
 Stockport County Ladies Development

Division One
 Egerton FC Women
 Congleton Town Ladies
 Frodsham Juniors Town Women
 Wythenshawe Amateurs (Juniors) Ladies 2nd
 Northwich Vixens Development Women
 Sale United 
 Willaston FC Ladies
 Manchester Rovers Womens
 Timperley Villa Youth Ladies

Youth Under 18's
 Chester FC Women's U18s
 Crosby Stuart U18 Girls JFC
 Macclesfield Town Ladies U18
 Glenavon JFC U18 Belles Women
 Stockport Cosmos U18 Comets Women
 Oxton Ladies U18
 Formby Community FC U18 United Women
 Crewe U18 Girls
 Crosfield Junior U18 Women
 Vale Juniors Congleton U18 U/18 Girls

Table

Division One 2017–18

Champions

References

External links

 

7
Football in Cheshire